Jeqjeq-e Vosta (also Romanized as Jeqjeq-e Vostá) is a village in Yurchi-ye Sharqi Rural District, Kuraim District, Nir County, Ardabil Province, Iran. At the 2006 census, its population was 41, in 7 families.

References 

Tageo

Towns and villages in Nir County